Carlos Burga (12 May 1952 – 18 January 2021) was a Peruvian boxer. He competed in the men's welterweight event at the 1972 Summer Olympics. Burga also competed in the welterweight class at the 1975 Pan American Games. Burga died in January 2021 from COVID-19 during the pandemic in Peru.

References

External links
 

1952 births
2021 deaths
Welterweight boxers
Peruvian male boxers
Olympic boxers of Peru
Boxers at the 1972 Summer Olympics
Pan American Games competitors for Peru
Boxers at the 1975 Pan American Games
Deaths from the COVID-19 pandemic in Peru
Place of birth missing
20th-century Peruvian people
21st-century Peruvian people